The 2018 Stanford Cardinal football team represented Stanford University in the 2018 NCAA Division I FBS football season. The Cardinal were led by eighth-year head coach David Shaw. They played their home games at Stanford Stadium and were members of the North Division of the Pac-12 Conference.

Stanford, coming off a 9–5 season and an appearance in the Pac-12 Championship Game in 2017, began the year ranked 13th in the preseason AP Poll. They won their first four games of the year, including wins over No. 17 USC and No. 20 Oregon, and rose to 7th in the polls. The Cardinal then lost four of their next five games, compiling losses to Notre Dame, Utah, Washington State, and Washington. After closing out the regular season with three straight wins, Stanford was third in the Pac-12 North with a conference record of 6–3. They were invited to the Sun Bowl, where they defeated ACC runner-up Pittsburgh to end the year at 9–4 overall.

Stanford's offense was led by junior quarterback K. J. Costello, who led the Pac-12 Conference in passer rating and finished in second in passing yards and touchdowns. Wide receiver J. J. Arcega-Whiteside finished with 1,059 receiving yards and a Pac-12-leading 14 receiving touchdowns. Offensive tackle Walker Little was named first-team all-conference. On defense, cornerback Paulson Adebo led the team with four interceptions and 17 passes defended, and was also named first-team all-conference.

Previous season
The Cardinal finished the 2017 season 9–5, 7–2 in Pac-12 play to win a share of the North Division title with Washington. Due to their head-to-head win over Washington, they represented the North Division in the Pac-12 Championship Game where they lost to USC. They were invited to the Alamo Bowl where they lost to TCU.

Recruiting

Position key

Recruits

The Cardinal signed a total of 14 recruits.

Preseason

Award watch lists
Listed in the order that they were released

Pac-12 Media Days
The 2018 Pac-12 media days are set for July 25, 2018 in Hollywood, California. David Shaw (HC), J. J. Arcega-Whiteside (WR) & Alijah Holder (CB) at Pac-12 Media Days. The Pac-12 media poll was released with the Cardinal predicted to finish in second place at Pac-12 North division.

Schedule

Personnel

Coaching staff

Roster

Game summaries

San Diego State

USC

UC Davis

at Oregon

Late in the 3rd quarter, Oregon led 24–7 and had a 1st & Goal at the Stanford 1-yard line. An ensuing fumble returned for a touchdown by the Stanford defense sparked an epic comeback where the Cardinal were able to win in overtime.

at Notre Dame

Utah

Starting running back Bryce Love sat the game out due to an ankle injury.

at Arizona State

Washington State

at Washington

Oregon State

Stanford beat Oregon State on a smoky night caused by the Camp Fire. The Air Quality Index was close to 150, which qualified as "Dangerous".

at UCLA

at California

The 121st installment of the Big Game was delayed due to unhealthy air quality caused by the Camp Fire. It was only the second time in 27 years that both teams had 7 or more wins. The Cardinal quickly jumped out to a 10–0 start and never looked back. From there, the game was mostly a defensive struggle as cornerback Paulson Adebo intercepted two passes from Cal's Chase Garbers. As a result of this game, Stanford extended its winning streak to 9 games, the longest by either team in the series.

vs. Pittsburgh (Sun Bowl)

Rankings

Players drafted into the NFL

References

Stanford
Stanford Cardinal football seasons
Sun Bowl champion seasons
Stanford Cardinal football